John Thomas Sheehan (April 15, 1893 – May 29, 1987) was a professional baseball player who played infield for the Brooklyn Robins in the 1920 and 1921 baseball seasons. He attended college at Fordham University.

After his playing career, Sheehan worked as the director of the Chicago Cubs farm system.

He later managed in the minor leagues during 1916–1953. After that, he became a scout, serving as Scouting Director for the Washington Senators in the 1960s.

References

External links

1893 births
1987 deaths
Atlanta Crackers players
Baseball players from Chicago
Brooklyn Robins players
Buffalo Bisons (minor league) players
Chicago Cubs scouts
Chicago White Sox scouts
Columbus Foxes players
Elmira Colonels players
Fond du Lac Molls players
Fordham Rams baseball players
Fort Wayne Cubs players
Jersey City Skeeters players
Knoxville Smokies players
Major League Baseball infielders
Major League Baseball scouting directors
Marinette-Menominee Twins players
Milwaukee Creams players
Minor league baseball managers
Newark Bears (IL) players
Oakland Oaks (baseball) players
Providence Grays (minor league) players
Rochester Tribe players
San Francisco Seals (baseball) players
Washington Senators (1961–1971) scouts
Wheeling Stogies players
Winnipeg Maroons (baseball) players
Zanesville Potters players
Zanesville Flood Sufferers players